The 1978 Belgian Grand Prix was a Formula One motor race held on 21 May 1978 at Zolder. It was the sixth race of the 1978 World Championship of F1 Drivers and the 1978 International Cup for F1 Constructors. The 70-lap race was won from pole position by Mario Andretti, driving the new Lotus 79. Teammate Ronnie Peterson was second in the older Lotus 78, with Carlos Reutemann third in a Ferrari.

Qualifying

Pre-qualifying classification 

*Positions in red indicate entries that failed to pre-qualify.

Qualifying classification 

*Positions in red indicate entries that failed to qualify.

Race

Report
The main news before the Belgian Grand Prix was that the new Lotus 79 was now ready to race, and immediately Mario Andretti showed its pace by taking pole comfortably from Carlos Reutemann and Niki Lauda. He converted it to a first-corner lead, whereas Reutemann had a bad start and got swamped by the field, causing a chain reaction in which Lauda was hit by Jody Scheckter and had to retire. This left Gilles Villeneuve second and Ronnie Peterson third but neither could keep pace with Andretti who was able to drive away.

The first 40 laps went without incident until Villeneuve suffered a puncture and had to pit which dropped him back down to fifth, and a few laps later Peterson also pitted for new tyres leaving the charging Reutemann second ahead of Jacques Laffite's Ligier. Peterson on the new tyres was much quicker and was able to pass them both in the closing stages, and Laffite made an attempt to pass Reutemann on the last lap but they collided and Laffite was out. Andretti cruised to an untroubled victory, with Peterson making it a Lotus 1–2, and Reutemann completing the podium.

Classification

Championship standings after the race 

Drivers' Championship standings

Constructors' Championship standings

References

Belgian Grand Prix
Belgian Grand Prix
Grand Prix
Circuit Zolder
Belgian Grand Prix